Cornbury and Wychwood is a civil parish in West Oxfordshire. It includes the country estate of Cornbury Park (Ordnance Survey ) and the ancient former Royal Forest of Wychwood, which covers several square miles between Cornbury Park, the village of Leafield and the hamlet of Mount Skippett.

Further reading

Civil parishes in Oxfordshire
West Oxfordshire District